Kayla Skrlik (born September 10, 1997) is a Canadian curler from Calgary, Alberta. She currently skips her own team out of the Garrison Curling Club.

Career
Skrlik broke onto the junior scene when she skipped Team Alberta at the 2016 U18 International Curling Championships. There, she led her team to a 3–2 round robin record, just missing the playoffs. She represented Alberta at her first junior nationals at the 2018 Canadian Junior Curling Championships. At the championship, Skrlik led her team of Ashton Skrlik, Hope Sunley and Megan Johnson to a 4–2 round robin record, enough to qualify for the championship round. They then went 3–1 against the other pool, however, this was not enough to qualify for the playoffs and they finished in fourth place with a 7–3 record. Also during the 2017–18 season, Skrlik played in the 2018 Humpty's Champions Cup with Team Delia DeJong. The team lost in the tiebreaker to the Val Sweeting rink. Also in her junior career, Skrlik led Northern Alberta to a gold medal at the 2014 Arctic Winter Games.

Out of juniors, Team Skrlik began competing on the World Curling Tour. For the 2018–19 season, they brought on Brenna Bilassy as their new lead, replacing Johnson. Of their three events played, they reached the quarterfinals of the Avonair Cash Spiel and the Boundary Ford Curling Classic.

The 2019–20 season was a breakthrough season for the Skrlik rink which consisted of Lindsay Makichuk, Brittany Tran and Hope Sunley. The team won two tour events, the Medicine Hat Charity Classic and The Good Times Bonspiel and represented Canada at the 2019 Changan Ford International Curling Elite. The team went 2–5 against the field in China. At the 2020 Alberta Scotties Tournament of Hearts, they also finished with a 2–5 record. Makichuk and Sunley left the team after the season and were replaced by Selena Sturmay and Ashton Skrlik for the 2020–21 season. They were unable to play in any events, however, due to the COVID-19 pandemic.

Following the abbreviated season, Sturmay left the team and was replaced by Geri-Lynn Ramsay at third. The team was able to find immediate success by reaching the semifinals of the Alberta Curling Series: Leduc event. They also made the semifinals of the Ladies Alberta Open and were finalists at the Alberta Curling Series: Thistle event to Germany's Daniela Jentsch. In December 2021, they qualified for the 2022 Alberta Scotties Tournament of Hearts by defeating Lindsay Bertsch in the final qualifier. At provincials, the team finished in last place with a 1–6 record. Back on the tour, they reached the final of the Alberta Curling Tour Championship where they lost to Abby Marks. Team Skrlik rounded out their season at the 2022 Best of the West where they failed to reach the playoffs with a 1–2 record.

Personal life
Skrlik's sister Ashton Skrlik plays lead on her team. She is in a relationship with fellow curler Jeremy Harty. She works as a business transformation consultant with IBM.

Teams

References

External links

1997 births
Canadian women curlers
Living people
Curlers from Calgary
20th-century Canadian women
21st-century Canadian women